Kaklamanis is a Greek surname. The female version of the name is Kaklamani (Greek: Κακλαμάνη).

Notable people with surname Kaklamanis:

 Apostolos Kaklamanis (born 1936), PASOK politician and speaker of the Hellenic Parliament 1993–2004
 Nikitas Kaklamanis (born 1946),ex-Mayor of Athens

Greek-language surnames
Surnames